Albert Joe Suárez Subero (born October 8, 1989) is a Venezuelan professional baseball pitcher for the Samsung Lions of the KBO League. He previously played for the Tokyo Yakult Swallows of Nippon Professional Baseball (NPB). He previously played for the San Francisco Giants of Major League Baseball.

Career

Tampa Bay Rays
On July 2, 2006, Suárez signed with the Tampa Bay Rays organization as an international free agent. Suárez began his professional career in 2008, playing for the rookie ball Princeton Rays and went 0–2 with a 3.92 ERA in 11 games (nine starts). In 2009, he pitched for the Low-A Hudson Valley Renegades, going a combined 1–0 with a 2.79 ERA in two starts. He pitched for the GCL Rays and the Single-A Bowling Green Hot Rods in 2010, going a combined 2–5 with a 3.38 ERA in 15 games (14 starts). On November 19, 2010, Suárez was added to the Rays' 40-man roster. In 2011, he was 1–1 with a 2.15 ERA in eight games between the GCL Rays and High-A Charlotte Stone Crabs and in 2012, he was 5–9 with a 4.08 ERA in 25 starts for Charlotte. On August 31, 2012, Suárez was designated for assignment by Tampa Bay. He cleared waivers on September 3 and was assigned to Double-A. He made two starts for the Double-A Montgomery Biscuits in 2013, posting a 1.42 ERA. On November 4, 2013, he elected free agency, but quickly re-signed with Tampa Bay on November 12 on a new minor league contract. With Charlotte and Montgomery in 2014, he went a combined 4–6 with a 3.60 ERA in 14 starts.

Los Angeles Angels
On November 24, 2014, Suárez signed a minor league contract with the Los Angeles Angels of Anaheim that included an invitation to Spring Training. He was assigned to the Double-A Arkansas Travelers to begin the year, and after going 11–9 with a 2.98 ERA in 27 starts for the team, he earned a 2015 Texas League Mid-Season All-Star selection. On November 6, 2015, he elected free agency.

San Francisco Giants
On November 18, 2015, Suárez signed a minor league contract with the San Francisco Giants organization that included an invitation to major league spring training. He was assigned to the Triple-A Sacramento River Cats to begin the 2016 season. Suárez was 1–2 with a 2.88 ERA in Triple-A when he was promoted to the major leagues for the first time on May 6, 2016.

Suárez made his major league debut on May 8, 2016, pitching one scoreless inning in relief against the Colorado Rockies.  Suárez earned his first major league win on May 11, pitching a scoreless top of the 13th inning against the Toronto Blue Jays, escaping a bases-loaded jam by inducing Blue Jays outfielder José Bautista to pop out. Suárez made his first major league start on June 1, 2016 against the Atlanta Braves, allowing 3 runs in 5 innings pitched. In the game, he got his first major league hit and RBI on an infield single off Ian Krol. He finished his rookie season with a 3-5 record and 4.29 ERA in 22 appearances. In 2017, Suárez logged an 0-3 record and a 5.12 ERA with 34 strikeouts in 18 appearances for the Giants. On December 1, 2017, Suárez was non-tendered by the Giants, but re-signed with the team on a minor league contract on December 10.

Arizona Diamondbacks
On December 14, 2017, Suárez was selected by the Arizona Diamondbacks in the Rule 5 draft. On March 24, 2018, Suárez was designated for assignment by Arizona and was outrighted to the Triple-A Reno Aces on March 27. He spent the year in Reno, logging a 4.97 ERA with 51 strikeouts in 63.1 innings of work. Suárez elected free agency on October 11, 2018.

Tokyo Yakult Swallows
On December 12, 2018, Suárez signed with the Tokyo Yakult Swallows of Nippon Professional Baseball (NPB). He finished his first NPB season with a 1.53 ERA in 4 appearances. The next year, he pitched in 12 games for Yakult, posting a 4-4 record and 2.67 ERA with 52 strikeouts in 67.1 innings.

Samsung Lions
On December 7, 2021, Suárez signed with the Samsung Lions of the Korea Baseball Organization. On December 7, 2022, Suarez re-signed a one-year $1.3 million contract for the 2023 season.

Personal life 
His brother, Robert Suárez, currently pitches for the San Diego Padres of Major League Baseball (MLB).

See also 
 List of players from Venezuela in Major League Baseball
 Rule 5 draft results

References

External links

1989 births
Arkansas Travelers players
Bowling Green Hot Rods players
Charlotte Stone Crabs players
Gulf Coast Rays players
Hudson Valley Renegades players
Leones del Caracas players
Living people
Major League Baseball pitchers
Major League Baseball players from Venezuela
Montgomery Biscuits players
Navegantes del Magallanes players
Nippon Professional Baseball pitchers
Princeton Rays players
Reno Aces players
Sacramento River Cats players
San Francisco Giants players
San Jose Giants players
Tokyo Yakult Swallows players
Venezuelan expatriate baseball players in the United States